Vietti is a surname. Notable people with the surname include:

Brandon Vietti, American television producer, director and animator
Celestino Vietti, Italian motorcycle racer
Eleanor Ardel Vietti, American physician and POW
Josh Vietti, American violinist and composer
Michele Vietti, Italian politician
Teresa J. Vietti, American oncologist